Short Story Playhouse was an American Anthology television series that aired live Chicago on NBC as the summer replacement for The Wayne King Show.

Among the presentations were Sinclair Lewis' "The Good Sport", James Thurber's "My Life and Hard Times", and Pearl Buck's "Ransom".

References

1951 American television series debuts
1951 American television series endings
NBC original programming
American live television series
1950s American anthology television series
Black-and-white American television shows